Pribava is a village in the municipality of Gračanica, Bosnia and Herzegovina.

Population

References

Populated places in Gračanica